The Campbell Fighting Camels wrestling team represents Campbell University of Buies Creek, North Carolina. The squad is coached by Scotti Sentes. The Fighting Camels are associate members of the Southern Conference.

History
Wrestling was founded at Campbell in 1968 under the guidance of Gerald Brown. There have been nine different coaches that directed the Camels over the past 40 years. Coach Jerry Hartman (1981–1988) led the Camels to an 80–39 record during his tenure as head coach. Former U.S. Olympic wrestling coach Dave Auble guided the team from 1999–2004. The current head coach is two-time NCAA All-American Scotti Sentes.

During Cary Kolat's six years as head coach (2014–2020), Campbell wrestling reached new levels. In 2017, Campbell won its first Southern Conference title in team history, sending five to the NCAA tournament. Nathan Kraisser also became the school's first All-American wrestler in 2017.

The Fighting Camels are associate members of the Southern Conference for wrestling, since the Big South Conference does not sponsor the sport.

2021 NCAA Tournament Clock Controversy
During the 2021 NCAA Division I Wrestling Championships, #20 seed Josh Heil of Campbell was wrestling the #4 seed Boo Lewallen. During the second overtime period with 30-second rideouts, the clock was at seven seconds but they never started the time back up. They started them up back in the middle and Josh Heil goes out of bounds, but they call series off because the clock never started. Campbell argued that if you put a stopwatch to the video, then 6.5 seconds of the 7 seconds would run off the clock, not even enough for Lewallen to get a shot in. But the NCAA said that without "concrete" evidence, they would restart with seven seconds left. And with this newfound time, Lewallen got the takedown, winning the match and going to the quarterfinals. 

If Josh Heil had won that match, he would have advanced to eventually face #12 seeded Max Murin of Iowa. Had the call gone his way, and had he gone on to defeat Murin, he would have been the second Camel to earn All-American status in Campbell Wrestling history. But with the loss to Lewallen, he was relegated to the consolation bracket. Heil beat Greg Gaxiola of Hofstra but fell to Duke's Josh Finesilver, one match away from the blood round.

Current Lineup

References

External links
 

 
1968 establishments in North Carolina
Sports clubs established in 1968